Michael Philip Forbes Davidson (born 24 September 1981 in Christchurch) is a New Zealand cricketer who plays for the Canterbury Wizards in the State Championship.

External links
 
 

1981 births
Living people
New Zealand cricketers
Canterbury cricketers
Cricketers from Christchurch
21st-century New Zealand people